Ganti may refer to:

 Ganti (2005 TV series), a 2005 Philippine television drama
 Ganti Jogi Somayaji, Telugu linguist, poet and chancellor
 Ganti Mohana Chandra Balayogi, past Speaker of Indian Lok Sabha
 Ganti Pedapudi (or Pedapudi), a village in a Gannvaram Mandal in East Godavari district, Andhra Pradesh, India
 Tibor Gánti Hungarian theoretical biologist and chemist

Indian surnames